Brachychilus scutellaris is a species of beetle in the family Cerambycidae. It was described by Blanchard in 1851. It is known from Chile and Argentina. It contains the varietas Brachychilus scutellaris var. irroratus.

References

Phacellini
Beetles described in 1851
Beetles of South America
Arthropods of Chile
Arthropods of Argentina